San Isidro is a barangay in Parañaque, Metro Manila, Philippines with a population of 2,582 in 549 households as of the latest census.

History
The barangay of San Isidro was established on April 3, 1978 through Presidential Decree No. 1323. The subdivisions of San Antonio Valley 2, 6, 12, 1, Clarmen Village, Salvador Estate, Lopez Village, Villa Mendoza and Parañaque Greenheights were separated from Barangay San Dionisio to form San Isidro.

Subdivisions
While Barangays are the administrative divisions of the city and are legally part of the addresses of establishments and homes of many residents indicate their Subdivision (village) instead of their Barangay.

See also
 PATTS College of Aeronautics

References 

Parañaque
Barangays of Metro Manila